George Wroughton Boyes (9 September 1910 – 19 May 1986) was a South African cricketer who played a single first-class match for Natal during the 1939–40 season. He was a right-handed middle-order batsman.

Boyes was the younger brother of Harry Boyes, who also played first-class cricket for Natal. The brothers were both born in Maseru in what is now Lesotho (previously part of the British colony of Basutoland). They represent two of only a handful of first-class cricketers to be born in that country. George Boyes played his only match for Natal in December 1939, against Orange Free State in Bloemfontein. He made three runs in the first innings and six not out in the second, and was in the middle when the winning runs were hit. The match was not part of the Currie Cup, which was not being contested during the 1939–40 season. Boyes died in Pietermaritzburg in 1986, aged 75.

Notes

References

1910 births
1986 deaths
KwaZulu-Natal cricketers
Lesotho cricketers
People from Maseru
South African cricketers